Fasil Bizuneh (born May 5, 1980) is an American long-distance runner born in Germany.

Bizuneh won individual and team gold medals at the 2007 NACAC Cross Country Championships. He also competed in the Senior men's race at the 2007 IAAF World Cross Country Championships.

References

External links

Living people
1980 births
American male long-distance runners
American male marathon runners
German emigrants to the United States
21st-century American people